One Nation was a social democratic political party in Israel.

History

The party was established on 25 March 1999 when Amir Peretz, Rafik Haj Yahia, and Adisu Massala broke away from the Israeli Labor Party to form a new faction.

In the May 1999 elections the party won 1.9% of the vote, equivalent to two seats, and was the smallest party to cross the electoral threshold of 1.5%. The seats were taken by Peretz and Haim Katz. Prior to the 2003 elections Katz left the party to join Likud.

In the elections One Nation won three seats, taken by Peretz, Ilana Cohen and David Tal. On 23 May 2005 the party merged back into the Labor Party, although Tal refused to join and established his own faction, Noy, which later merged into Kadima.

References

External links
One Nation Knesset website

Political parties established in 1999
Defunct political parties in Israel
Zionist political parties in Israel
Labor Zionism
Political parties disestablished in 2005
1999 establishments in Israel
2005 disestablishments in Israel